An annular solar eclipse took place at the Moon's descending node of the orbit on Monday, April 18, 1977. A solar eclipse occurs when the Moon passes between Earth and the Sun, thereby totally or partly obscuring the image of the Sun for a viewer on Earth. An annular solar eclipse occurs when the Moon's apparent diameter is smaller than the Sun's, blocking most of the Sun's light and causing the Sun to look like an annulus (ring). An annular eclipse appears as a partial eclipse over a region of the Earth thousands of kilometres wide. Annularity was visible in South West Africa (today's Namibia), Angola, Zambia, southeastern Zaire (today's Democratic Republic of Congo), northern Malawi, Tanzania, Seychelles and the whole British Indian Ocean Territory.

Related eclipses

Eclipses in 1977 
 A partial lunar eclipse on Monday, 4 April 1977.
 An annular solar eclipse on Monday, 18 April 1977.
 A penumbral lunar eclipse on Tuesday, 27 September 1977.
 A total solar eclipse on Wednesday, 12 October 1977.

Solar eclipses of 1975–1978

Saros 138 
It is a part of Saros cycle 138, repeating every 18 years, 11 days, containing 70 events. The series started with partial solar eclipse on June 6, 1472. It contains annular eclipses from August 31, 1598, through February 18, 2482 with a hybrid eclipse on March 1, 2500. It has total eclipses from March 12, 2518, through April 3, 2554. The series ends at member 70 as a partial eclipse on July 11, 2716. The longest duration of totality will be only 56 seconds on April 3, 2554.
<noinclude>

Inex series

Metonic series

Notes

References

1977 4 18
1977 in science
1977 4 18
April 1977 events